Qward is a fictional world existing within an anti-matter universe that is part of the . It was first mentioned in Green Lantern (vol. 2) #2 (October 1960).

Fictional history
Krona, an Oan scientist from the planet Maltus, performed a forbidden experiment to try to see the origin of the universe. Somehow, this disrupted the process of cosmic creation, resulting in the creation of the first multiverse including an additional, opposite universe. Qward is that universe's counterpart to Oa.

Qward was ruled by their universe's version of the Monitor (who would come to be called the Anti-Monitor by Earth's superheroes). It was this entity that created the organization of warriors known as the Weaponers of Qward within the race known as Qwardians. The Qwardians are the anti-matter counterparts to the Guardians of the Universe. Although the Anti-Monitor was defeated and imprisoned by his counterpart from the positive-matter universe, the Weaponers themselves continued to rule their world. In one of the earliest JLA/JSA crossovers, a being from the anti-matter Universe called Anti-Matter Man appeared, who was an explorer who was travelling through warp-space towards Earth-1 and 2, apparently not aware that contact with them would make them explode. This being was tens of metres high with blue skin and had some resistance to magic, along with strange powers which could warp positive-matter. He was sent back to his universe using shock-waves caused by the Spectre and Atom.

Qward's universe has been described as a "universe of evil", but this might just be a wrong impression on the part of those superheroes from the positive universe that have clashed with them. Qwardian society seems indeed to be dominated by a philosophy of selfishness and greed. This could be the effects of millennia of inescapable rule by the tyrannical Weaponers. There are Qwardians who rebel against their society's morality, however. In the first appearance of Qward, Green Lantern met a Qwardian who had escaped to the positive-matter universe, as he was part of a group that wanted to escape the society of evil. They identify themselves with the Pilgrims fleeing to America to escape oppression. The Qwardian was killed when he pushed Green Lantern out of the way of a yellow weapon thrown by a Weaponer that wounded him. Green Lantern was able to travel to Qward and helped the other members of the group, who the Qwardians were attacking, escape to the positive-matter universe, leaving them on an asteroid from where they can build their lives.

Supervillains
The group of supervillains called the Crime Syndicate, evil counterparts of the Justice League from a parallel universe, had earlier been rewritten as being from Qward, established as an evil world within the normal universe, since at the time, parallel universes were no longer supposed to be used in DC Comics stories. Later on, in JLA: Earth 2, the Syndicate has been reintroduced as coming from a parallel Earth within the Qwardian universe, now described as an actual anti-matter universe. The first group is re-established as being Qwardian Weaponers also using the Syndicate's aliases.  The "real" Crime Syndicate of Amerika has since popped up in a number of DC Comics stories, including the ongoing weekly comic Trinity, by Kurt Busiek and Mark Bagley.

Nero
During Kyle Rayner's tenure as Green Lantern, the Qwardian Weaponers again sought to oppose the remains of the Guardians by empowering an agent with a yellow power ring. After a disastrous attempt involving Fatality, the Qwardians then found a more suitable servant in Alexander Nero.

As Nero grew more powerful by subconsciously siphoning the burgeoning Parallax energy within Earth's sun, it was shown that the Weaponers had developed an almost cult-like fascination with him. During a battle with Nero in which the Weaponers intervened, Kyle learned that it was their secret desire to be destroyed by their creation.

Syndicate Rules
In the JLA storyline "Syndicate Rules", written by Kurt Busiek, the mythology and culture of Qward were greatly expanded upon, clarifying their Post-Crisis status. The storyline detailed a coup d'état in which the Thunderers were united under Irik Roval. Roval slew First Weaponlord Varnathon of Q'Uld, ending the Weaponers' reign over Qward. Claiming the Weapons of Rengar, he was crowned the new Highlord of Qward. Roval then located the prison of Erdammeru, the Void Hound, an ancient weapon of the Qward. Erdammeru had been built as a mechanical version of a mythical deity of Qward.

Roval piloted the Void Hound through an ancient Qwa-portal into the positive-matter universe, where he did battle against the Justice League in search of the ancient scientist Krona, who had nearly obliterated Qward during the JLA/Avengers crossover event. Though Roval was eventually forced to retreat by the destruction of the Void Hound, Qward remained a threat to the Justice League, revitalized under their new leader.

Sinestro Corps

With the Green Lantern Corps restarted with the return of Hal Jordan, Sinestro has decided to found the Sinestro Corps, offering yellow power rings, and a role in the Corps, to the most feared and savage warriors of the universe. The Sinestro Corps is headquartered in the anti-matter universe on Qward, in Sector -1.

In an interview with Geoff Johns, then writer of the Green Lantern series, it was revealed that the Sinestro Corps is a mirror organization to the GLC. Geoff Johns revealed that "the Sinestro Corps [will have] its own Oa-type planet, its own Guardians, [and] its own oath", as is now the case with all seven Corps.

Arkillo, a large and muscular vicious alien who fills the same role of Drill Sergeant held by Kilowog in the GLC, is enslaving all the Qwardian Weaponers and forcing them to continuously build new yellow rings, programmed to breach the barrier between the anti-matter and positive-matter universes and find and recruit new ring wielders.

All Qwardians now sport slave collars, put on them by Sinestro himself to ensure their loyalty. In addition, Qward had a huge yellow "Central Battery" (a parallel to Oa's green "Central Battery") which has since been captured by the GLC and relocated to Oa. Corps members also seem to kill Qwardians for fun and send them armed with overcharged batteries as suicide bombers.

Known members, other than the Corps namesake and Arkillo, include Karu-sil, "the girl next door" from a planet populated by murders and sociopaths, where she was raised by demonic wolf-like beings; Despotellis, a sentient virus capable of attacking Lanterns from the inside; Bedovian, the sniper of the Corps, capable of taking out a target from three sectors away while living on the fungus growing on his "hermit crab"-like shell. Batman was even considered as a possible candidate for the Sinestro Corps (due to his ability to inspire great fear in his enemies, which seems to be the primary requirement for induction into the Corps), but due to his immense willpower, alongside his previous exposure to the Green Lantern ring's energy, he rejected the ring that was sent to him. Instead, the ring went to Amon Sur, the son of Green Lantern Abin Sur.

In the Green Lantern Corps story "Tygers", by Alan Moore, Abin Sur is witness to a prophecy which states that among the gathered enemies to destroy the Green Lantern Corps would be the "Weaponers of Qward"; the Sinestro Corps War storyline is a partial fulfillment of that prophecy, later to be known as "The Blackest Night".

Blackest Night
The Qwardians whom the Sinestro Corps killed were revealed to have been reanimated as Black Lanterns and were at war with their murderers and even their still-living members.

Brightest Day
After the end of the Blackest Night crossover, the Qwardians witness the return of the Anti-Monitor to their planet and his short battle with Deadman. One of these Qwardians, a master Weaponer, takes the constructs left behind by Deadman, fashions them into a powerful hammer and shield (empowered by the White Light) and vows revenge against Sinestro. This Qwardian, who simply dubs himself "the Weaponer" is revealed to be the one who made Sinestro's original yellow ring. He attacks Korugar, defeats Kyle Rayner and captures Sinestro's daughter, Soranik Natu.

The New 52
In The New 52 (a 2011 reboot of the DC Comics universe), the Weaponer has made a yellow ring for Arkillo, one that is free from the lethal boobytraps that Sinestro had implanted in all previous Yellow Lantern rings, in turn for having the chance to get inside Invictus' ship.

Known inhabitants

Weaponers and Thunderers

Qwardians resemble humans, except that they are totally hairless and have large, prominent eyes. The Weaponers seem to have a military structure. Their most noteworthy warriors are the Thunderers, flying warriors that are equipped with throwable weapons shaped like lightning bolts that turn into a form of energy called "Qwa" when thrown. This energy is the Weaponers' primary weapon, and is somehow able to hurt even Superman. They also have yellow shields. The Qwardians have legends of fierce energy-creatures called Qwa-angels; whether these exist or not is unknown. It is mentioned in one of their earliest appearances that the Chief Weaponer is called Kalmin. The Weaponers also possess advanced technology, the development of which was motivated over the centuries by their attempts to develop a weapon powerful enough to open a mysterious artifact called the "Golden Obelisk of Qward". They were able to create a yellow "power ring" for the supervillain Sinestro, a former Green Lantern who had been exiled to their universe for using his power to take over his world. He was their ally against their long-time foes, the Green Lantern Corps from the positive-matter universe, who have opposed their attempts to conquer their universe several times (including kidnapping Olivia Reynolds on more than one occasion, in attempts to harness her U-Mind to access the Ergono power). The Weaponers have also clashed with the Justice League of America and other DC Comics superheroes.

In order to travel into, and out of, the anti-matter universe, one must pass through special "portals" that instantly reverse the polarity of subatomic particles as they pass through them, since any contact between positive and anti-matter would result in a tremendous explosion that would disintegrate both. This was used in their first three appearances, but during the first appearance of Sinestro it was blocked to prevent Green Lantern from entering their universe.

One noteworthy figure within the Weaponers was one General Fabrikant, who was a tactical genius as well as being midget-sized. Fabrikant entered Earth, disguised himself as a child, and insinuated himself into the private life of the greatest Green Lantern, Hal Jordan. He was discovered, however, and his plans of conquest were undone.

When the Anti-Monitor reawakened, he re-established his rule over Qward, and transformed several of the Thunderers into "Shadow-Demons" that he then used to help him in his plans to destroy all positive-matter universes, so that the anti-matter universe would increase in size, making him even more powerful. These creatures could kill by touch and murdered trillions. Eventually, however, the Anti-Monitor was destroyed by the heroes of Earth, and the Weaponers recovered control of Qward. Pre-Crisis, the Anti-Monitor absorbed the entire anti-matter universe, killing the inhabitants in the process, although this was seemingly reversed after the battle at the beginning of time.

Shadowforce

Shadowforce is a supervillain team from Qward that banded up together to become wealthy. Members of the team were Deadeye, Elasti-Man, Element-Man, Fiero, Frostbite, Scarab, and Slipstream. Its opponents were The Conglomerate and the Justice League.

In other media

Television
 In the Challenge of the Super Friends episode "Doomsday", Superman faces Krypton's Black Knight Nartan and his Kryptonite energy monster in the universe of Qward.
 Qward appears in Batman: The Brave and the Bold episode "Cry Freedom Fighters!". It is ruled by a dictator called the Supreme Chairman of Qward (voiced by Wade Williams). His men took out the resistance led by Teletig after he had sent a distress signal to Earth warning them about the Supreme Chairman's invasion of Earth. This was picked up by Uncle Sam and the Freedom Fighters who bring Batman and Plastic Man along after stopping some of the Supreme Chairman's soldiers who crashed the voting polls.

Film
 In the animated film Green Lantern: First Flight, Qward is where Kanjar Ro took the yellow element for the Weaponers to forge into Sinestro's yellow power ring and battery. Unlike in the comics, Qward is located in Sector 324 of the positive-matter universe, though the Weaponers (voiced by Rob Paulsen) themselves do state that they are from another dimension. In addition, the Weaponers are an insectoid species rather than humanoid and appear to function as a group mind, although they retain their characteristic skin color from the comics.

Video games
 Qward appears in the video game Lego Batman 3: Beyond Gotham. A Thunderer of Qward appears as a playable character.

References

External links
 GLCorps.com: Qwardians
 Monitor Duty.com Qward profile section

DC Comics dimensions
DC Comics planets